Hyperolius drewesi is a species of frog in the family Hyperoliidae. It is endemic to the island of Príncipe in São Tomé and Príncipe. Common names include  Oceanic tree frog  and Drewes' reed frog. It is the only Reed frog found on Príncipe Island.

Description
Hyperolius drewesi is described from 17 males and one female, the male snout-vent range 24.8 – 30.9 mm and the female 32.7 mm. Both sexes are green. Juvenile coloration is tan with bright yellow dorsolateral lines.

References

Bell, R. C. (2016). “A new species of Hyperolius (Amphibia: Hyperoliidae) from Príncipe Island, Democratic Republic of São Tomé and Príncipe. Herpetologica 72 (4): 343-351

drewesi
Endemic fauna of São Tomé and Príncipe
Amphibians described in 2016
Frogs of Africa
Amphibians of West Africa